The Institut des Hautes Etudes Commerciales de Carthage or IHEC Carthage is the first business school in Tunisia, it was founded in 1942.

It is ranked as 1st business school in Tunisia and  6th for French-speaking Africa as for 2011.

History 
 
IHEC Carthage was established in 1942 and formerly called Carthage Business School as the first business school establishment in Tunisia, yet in 1967 the school became the Carthage High Commercial Studies Institute and was organized according to the law N°77-319 on March 30, 1977.

Departments  
The IHEC Carthage has six independent departments:
 Management
 Economy
 Finance
 Law
 Accounting
 Quantitative methods
 Data processing

Notable alumni 
 Ali Zouaoui
 Nejib Belkadhi
 Sofiane Bouhdiba
 Faten Kallel
 Slim Khalbous

See also 
 University of Carthage

References

External links 
Official website

Universities in Tunisia
1942 establishments in Tunisia